Filifera is a suborder of hydrozoans in the order Anthoathecata. They are found in marine, brackish and freshwater habitats.

Characteristics
Members of this suborder are characterised by the filiform tentacles of the polyps which do not terminate in knobs. The rose corals, family Stylasteridae, secrete calcium carbonate exoskeletons around a network of stolons.

Families

According to the World Register of Marine Species, the following families are found in this suborder :

Australomedusidae Russell, 1971
Axoporidae Boschma, 1951 †
Balellidae Stechow, 1922
Bougainvilliidae Lütken, 1850
Bythotiaridae Maas, 1905
Clathrozoellidae Peña Cantero, Vervoort & Watson, 2003
Cordylophoridae von Lendenfeld, 1885
Cytaeididae L. Agassiz, 1862
Eucodoniidae Schuchert, 1996
Eudendriidae L. Agassiz, 1862
Heterotentaculidae Schuchert, 2010
Hydractiniidae L. Agassiz, 1862
Jeanbouilloniidae Pagès, Flood & Youngbluth, 2006
Magapiidae Schuchert & Bouillon, 2009
Niobiidae Petersen, 1979
Oceaniidae Eschscholtz, 1829
Pandeidae Haeckel, 1879
Proboscidactylidae Hand & Hendrickson, 1950
Protiaridae Haeckel, 1879
Ptilocodiidae Coward, 1909
Rathkeidae Russell, 1953
Rhysiidae (Hickson & Gravely, 1907)
Similiclavidae Calder, Choong & McDaniel, 2015
Stylasteridae Gray, 1847
Trichydridae Hincks, 1868
Tubiclavoididae Moura, Cunha & Schuchert, 2007
Filifera incertae sedis

References

 
Anthoathecata